The Unburied Man is a 2004 Hungarian-Slovakian-Polish drama film. It is based on the life of former Prime Minister of Hungary, Imre Nagy, who was executed following the failed Hungarian Revolution of 1956.

Cast 
 Jan Nowicki - Imre Nagy
 Marianna Moór - Mária Égető, his wife
 Lili Horváth - Erzsébet Nagy, their daughter
 György Cserhalmi - prison doctor
 Jan Frycz - interrogation officer
 Pál Mácsai - presiding justice Ferenc Vida
 János Kulka - Gyula Kállai
 Frigyes Hollósi - Yugoslavian ambassador
 Péter Andorai - Ferenc Münnich
 Vladimír Hajdu

References

External links 

2004 drama films
Films directed by Márta Mészáros
Hungarian drama films
Slovak drama films
Polish drama films